The Royal Guelphic Order, sometimes referred to as the Hanoverian Guelphic Order, is a Hanoverian order of chivalry instituted on 28 April 1815 by the Prince Regent (later King George IV). It takes its name from the House of Guelph, of which the Hanoverians were a branch. Since Hanover and the United Kingdom shared a monarch until 1837, the order was frequently bestowed upon British subjects.

History
Until 1837 the order was frequently awarded to officers in the British Navy and Army, although it was still classed as a foreign order, with British members of the order not entitled to style themselves as "Sir" unless they were also created Knights Bachelor, as many were.

The British link ended in 1837 when Hanover's royal union with Great Britain ended, with Ernest Augustus becoming King of Hanover and Queen Victoria ascending the British throne. When Hanover was annexed by the Kingdom of Prussia in 1866, the order continued as a house order to be awarded by the Royal House of Hanover. Today, its current Sovereign is the Hanoverian head of the house, Ernst August, Prince of Hanover.

Classes
The insignia was based on the white horse on Hanover's arms.

The Order includes two divisions, Civil and Military, the latter indicated by crossed swords on both the badge and star. It originally had three classes, but with several reorganisations since 1841, as house order today it has four classes and an additional Cross of Merit. In descending order of seniority the classes are:

1815–1841
 Knight Grand Cross (GCH). Received a collar chain and badge, a star worn on the left breast, and a badge worn from sash over the right shoulder. 
 Knight Commander (KCH). A neck badge worn from a ribbon, with a breast star, smaller than that for the GCH. 
 Knight (KH). Wore the badge on the left breast. Versions in both gold and silver were awarded. 
Holders of the respective degrees of the order in Britain were entitled to be post-nominally addressed with the initials, which stand for Knight Grand Cross of Hanover, Knight Commander of Hanover and Knight of Hanover. The initial GCG was also used, and was cited in the original statutes of the order.

Gold and silver medals were attached to the order, for award to those not eligible for the order itself, including non commissioned officers and royal servants.

After 1841
Grand Cross
Commander 1st Class
Commander 2nd Class
Knight
Cross of Merit

The Order

Officers
The Order has six officers: the Chancellor, the Vice-Chancellor, the Registrar, the King of Arms, the Genealogist, and the Secretary.

Officers until 1837
The first six officers were:
 Chancellor: Count Ernst Friedrich Herbert von Münster
 Vice-Chancellor: Georg Nieper
 Secretary: Ludwig Moeller
 King of Arms: Sir George Nayler
 Genealogist: August Neubourg
 Registrar: Sir William Woods

Officers since 1987
Chancellor: Ernst August, Prince of Hanover

Members
List of Knights Grand Cross of the Royal Guelphic Order
List of Knights Commander of the Royal Guelphic Order

 Charles Ashe à Court-Repington
 Charles Babbage
 Lovell Benjamin Badcock
 William Stanhope Badcock
 Henry Bayly (British Army officer, born 1790)
 Charles Bell
 George Frederick Beltz
 William Brereton (British Army officer)
 David Brewster
 Samuel Brown (Royal Navy officer)
 George Brown (British Army officer)
 Thomas Bunbury (British Army general)
 Ryder Burton
 Nicholas Carlisle
 James Charles Chatterton
 Robert Alexander Chermside
 Thomas Henry Shadwell Clerke
 Abraham Josias Cloëté
 William Colebrooke
 John Cowell-Stepney
 Henry John Cumming
 Augustus De Butts
 Edward Cromwell Disbrowe
 Wilhelm von Dörnberg
 William Granville Eliot
 William Henry Elliott
 Henry Ellis (librarian)
 Richard England (British Army officer, born 1793)
 Mathias Everard
 Arthur Farquhar (Royal Navy officer, born 1772)
 Alexander Findlay (British Army officer)
 Charles Augustus FitzRoy
 Charles Fergusson Forbes
 William Forster (British Army officer)
 James Freeth
 Robert Garrett (British Army officer)
 George Gawler
 Johann Karl Ludwig Gieseler
 Charles Stephen Gore
 Gideon Gorrequer
 Gottlieb Graf von Haeseler
 Andrew Halliday (physician)
 Henry Hanmer
 Jakob von Hartmann
 Graves Haughton
 William Havelock
 Andrew Leith Hay
 William Henderson (Royal Navy officer)
 William Herschel
 John Herschel
 Felton Hervey-Bathurst
 John Hindmarsh
 William Jackson Hooker
 William Hotham (Royal Navy officer, born 1794)
 John Hobart Caradoc, 2nd Baron Howden
 Frederick Irwin
 James Ivory (mathematician)
 James Jackson (British Army officer)
 William Jervois (British Army officer)
 Love Jones-Parry (British Army officer)
 Heinrich Kirchweger
 Charles Konig
 Joseph de Courcy Laffan
 Henry John Leeke
 John Leslie (physicist)
 Henry Frederick Lockyer
 Edmund Lodge
 Frederick Love
 Alexander Maconochie (penal reformer)
 Frederic Madden
 Charles Menzies (Royal Marines officer)
 Samuel Rush Meyrick
 Charles Collier Michell
 William Taylor Money
 Sir John Murray, 8th Baronet
 George Nayler
 Robert Nickle (British Army officer)
 Nicholas Harris Nicolas
 John Owen (Royal Marines officer)
 Francis Palgrave
 George William Paty
 John Pennycuick (British Army infantry officer)
 George Dean Pitt
 Henry Riddell
 John Robison (inventor)
 John Robyns
 Sir David Scott, 2nd Baronet
 Robert Smart
 Charles Hamilton Smith
 Frederick Smith (British Army officer, born 1790)
 Henry Somerset (British Army officer)
 John Spink
 Thomas Staunton St Clair
 Joseph Thackwell
 Edward Thomason
 Walter Tremenheere
 George Tyler (Royal Navy officer)
 James Maxwell Wallace
 George Wetherall
 Edward Charles Whinyates
 Charles Wilkins
 Frederick von Wissell
 William Woods (officer of arms)

See also
 Hanoverian Waterloo Medal
 Order of Ernst August
 Order of St. George (Hanover)

References

External links 
 

Royal Guelphic Order
Guelphic Order
1815 establishments in the Kingdom of Hanover
Awards established in 1815
Orders, decorations, and medals of Hanover